Archie Macdonald Fisher  (born 23 October 1939) is a Scottish folk singer and songwriter. He has released several solo albums since his first, eponymous album, in 1968. Fisher composed the song "The Final Trawl", recorded on the album Windward Away, that several other groups and singers, including The Clancy Brothers, have also recorded. Starting in the mid-1970s, he produced four folk albums with Makem and Clancy. He also performed with them and other groups as a backup singer and guitarist. He hosted his own radio show on BBC Radio Scotland for almost three decades.

Early life
Archie Fisher was born in Glasgow on 23 October 1939 into a large singing family. His sister Cilla Fisher is also a professional singer, as was his late sister Ray. In 1960 he moved to Edinburgh and appeared regularly at "The Howff" folk club run by Roy Guest. In 1962 Ray and Archie released the single "Far Over the Forth" on the Topic Records label and appeared on the BBC Hootenanny programme. In 1965 the whole family released the album Traditional and New Songs from Scotland.

Edinburgh Folk Festival 
By 1964 the Edinburgh Fringe could boast a folk festival in its own right. An album of the participants was released on Decca. It was called Edinburgh Folk Festival vol 2 and contained tracks by Ray Fisher, Archie Fisher, Anne Briggs and the Ian Campbell Folk Group (including Dave Swarbrick). Bert Jansch and Briggs performed together but this was never recorded. At an early stage Fisher recognised the power of Barbara Dickson's singing and in 1969 invited her to guest on his albums. His live act included 'All Around My Hat', later to become a hit for Steeleye Span. His song "Witch of the Westmorland" was recorded by Dickson in 1971 on her album From the Beggar's Mantle, by Fisher himself on The Man With a Rhyme in 1976, by Stan Rogers in 1979 and by Golden Bough in 1983.

Comeback
In 1983 Fisher started hosting the long-running BBC Radio Scotland folk programme Travelling Folk. He retired in April 2010, handing over presenting duties to fiddler Bruce MacGregor. He appeared as the lead guitarist on Tom Paxton's 1986 album, The Very Best of Tom Paxton, and performed with Tommy Makem and Liam Clancy on television, recordings and concert tours. He also produced the Irish duo's first four albums, Tommy Makem & Liam Clancy (1976), The Makem & Clancy Concert (1977), Two For The Early Dew (1978) and The Makem & Clancy Collection (1980). After Barbara Dickson achieved fame as an easy listening singer, it was many years before she sang folk songs again. When she did, Fisher was invited back to join her.

Fisher has toured Canada and the US as a solo act as well as appearing with Garnet Rogers and with John Renbourn. His style of singing is very gentle and he avoids all electronic instruments. "Dark-Eyed Molly" has been recorded by Fairport Convention (who also recorded "The Wounded Whale"), Eva Cassidy, Stan Rogers and Sheena Wellington. "Lindsay" has been recorded by John Renbourn and has been a highlight at his live shows for years, while "Mountain Rain" has been recorded by Wizz Jones (along with John Renbourn on guitar).

Fisher now lives in the south of Scotland. He was awarded an MBE in the New Year Honours List in 2006.

Discography

Fisher Family
Traditional and New Songs From Scotland (1965)
The Fisher Family Topic (1966)

In 2009 Come All ye Fisher Lasses from The Fisher family was included in Topic Records 70 year anniversary boxed set Three Score and Ten as track two on the fourth CD.

Solo recordings
Archie Fisher (1968)
Orfeo (1970)
Will Ye Gang, Love? (1976)
The Man With A Rhyme (1976)
Sunsets I've Galloped Into (1988)
Windward Away (2008)
A Silent Song  (2015)

With Barbara Dickson
The Fate o' Charlie (1969)
Thro' The Recent Years (1970)

With Garnet Rogers
Off the Map (1986)

With Frightened Rabbit
"The Work", which he co-wrote, on A Frightened Rabbit EP (2011)

References

1939 births
Scottish folk singers
Scottish radio personalities
Members of the Order of the British Empire
Living people
Musicians from Glasgow
Scottish songwriters
Red House Records artists
Topic Records artists